Haplothismia is a genus of myco-heterotrophic plants in family Burmanniaceae, first described as a genus in 1952. There is only one known species, Haplothismia exannulata, endemic to southern India (Kerala + Tamil Nadu). The plant is mycotrophic, i.e. lacking chlorophyll and obtaining sustenance from fungi in the soil.

References

Burmanniaceae
Monotypic Dioscoreales genera
Parasitic plants
Endemic flora of India (region)